Aloysius Balina (21 January 1945 – 6 November 2012) was bishop of the Roman Catholic Diocese of Shinyanga, Tanzania.

Born in Isoso and ordained to the priesthood on 21 June 1971, Balina was appointed by Pope John Paul II as Bishop of Geita in 1984; he was consecrated by John Paul II on 6 January 1985. In 1997, he was appointed Bishop of Shinyanga; he was installed on 17 November the same year.

Balina died on 6 November 2012 in Mwanza, Tanzania.

References

1945 births
2012 deaths
21st-century Roman Catholic bishops in Tanzania
Deaths from liver cancer
20th-century Roman Catholic bishops in Tanzania
Roman Catholic bishops of Geita
Roman Catholic bishops of Shinyanga